Space-based measurements of carbon dioxide are used to help answer questions about Earth's carbon cycle. There are a variety of active and planned instruments for measuring carbon dioxide in Earth's atmosphere from space. The first satellite mission designed to measure  was the Interferometric Monitor for Greenhouse Gases (IMG) on board the ADEOS I satellite in 1996. This mission lasted less than a year. Since then, additional space-based measurements have begun, including those from two high-precision (better than 0.3% or 1 ppm) satellites (GOSAT and OCO-2). Different instrument designs may reflect different primary missions.

Purposes and highlights of findings 

There are outstanding questions in carbon cycle science that satellite observations can help answer. The Earth system absorbs about half of all anthropogenic  emissions. However, it is unclear exactly how this uptake is partitioned to different regions across the globe. It is also uncertain how different regions will behave in terms of  flux under a different climate. For example, a forest may increase  uptake due to the fertilization or β-effect, or it could release  due to increased metabolism by microbes at higher temperatures. These questions are difficult to answer with historically spatially and temporally limited data sets.

 Megacity  enhancements were observed with the GOSAT satellite and minimum observable space-based changes in emissions were estimated.

 Satellite observations have been used for visualizing how  is distributed globally, including studies that have focused on anthropogenic emissions.

 Flux estimates were made of  into and out of different regions.

 Correlations were observed between anomalous temperatures and  measurements in boreal regions.

 Emission ratios with methane were measured from forest fires.

  emission ratios with carbon monoxide (a marker of incomplete combustion) measured by the MOPITT instrument were analyzed over major urban regions across the globe to measure developing/developed status.

 OCO-2 observations were used to estimate  emissions from wildfires in Indonesia in 2015.

 OCO-2 observations were also used to estimate the excess land-ocean flux due to the 2014–16 El Niño event.

 GOSAT observations were used to attribute 2010-2011 El Niño Modoki on the Brazilian carbon balance.

 OCO-2 observations were used to quantify  emissions from individual power plants, demonstrating the potential for future space-based  emission monitoring.

Challenges 
Remote sensing of trace gases has several challenges. Most techniques rely on observing infrared light reflected off Earth's surface. Because these instruments use spectroscopy, at each sounding footprint a spectrum is recorded—this means there is a significantly (about 1000×) more data to transfer than what would be required of just an RGB pixel. Changes in surface albedo and viewing angles may affect measurements, and satellites may employ different viewing modes over different locations; these may be accounted for in the algorithms used to convert raw into final measurements. As with other space-based instruments, space debris must be avoided to prevent damage.

To calculate this, instruments may also measure O, which is diluted similarly to other gases, or the algorithms may account for water and surface pressure from other measurements. Clouds may interfere with accurate measurements so platforms may include instruments to measure clouds. Because of measurement imperfections and errors in fitting signals to obtain X, space-based observations may also be compared with ground-based observations such as those from the TCCON.

List of instruments

Partial column measurements 
In addition to the total column measurements of  down to the ground, there have been several limb sounders that have measured  through the edge of Earth's upper atmosphere, and thermal instruments that measure the upper atmosphere during the day and night.
Sounding of the Atmosphere using Broadband Emission Radiometry (SABER) onboard TIMED launched 7 December 2001 makes measurements in the mesosphere and lower thermosphere in thermal bands.
ACE-FTS (Atmospheric Chemistry Experiment-Fourier Transform Spectrometer) onboard SCISAT-1 launched 13 August 2003 measures solar spectra, from which profiles of  can be calculated.
SOFIE (Solar Occultation for Ice Experiment) is a limb sounder onboard the AIM satellite launched 25 April 2007.

Conceptual Missions 
There have been other conceptual missions which have undergone initial evaluations but have not been chosen to become a part of space-based observing systems. These include:
Active Sensing of  Emissions over Nights, Days, and Seasons (ASCENDS) is a lidar-based mission
Geostationary Fourier Transform Spectrometer (GeoFTS)
Atmospheric Imaging Mission for Northern regions (AIM-North) would involve a constellation of two satellites in elliptical orbits to focus on northern regions.  The concept is undergoing a Phase 0 study in 2019-2020.
Carbon Monitoring Satellite (CarbonSat) was a concept for an imaging satellite with global coverage approximately every 6 days. This mission never proceeded beyond the concept phase.

References 

Satellite meteorology
Atmosphere of Earth
Carbon dioxide